Etawah Safari Park (formerly Etawah Lion Safari) is a drive-through safari park in Etawah, Uttar Pradesh, India. It was opened to the public in November 2019. It includes multiple safaris, an Asiatic lion breeding centre and a visitor centre.

History
Etawah Lion Safari was first proposed in 2006. Work was started in May 2012. The park was designed by Spanish company Art Urbà. At first,  six lions were migrated to the park in 2014. In 2015 a deer safari, antelope safari, bear safari and leopard safari were added and the park was renamed as Etawah Safari Park. The deer safari was inaugurated on 6 October 2016 and the remaining safaris as well as the park itself were inaugurated on 1 June 2018. The park opened to the public on 24 November 2019 without the lion segment.

Safaris
Multiple safaris includes a lion safari, a deer safari, an antelope safari, a bear safari and a leopard safari. , the lion and leopard safaris are waiting for approval from the Central Zoo Authority (CZA).

Asiatic Lion breeding centre
The Asiatic Lion breeding centre has twelve breeding dens. It was started with eleven lions that arrived in September 2014 mostly from zoos of Gujarat. Four of the lions and five cubs died because of canine distemper after which the lions were vaccinated by an imported vaccine from the USA. , the center has nine cubs who are born there.

Facilities

A visitor facilitation centre includes a multimedia museum with digital signage and large format displays, and a '4D' education theatre for informing and guiding visitors.

See also
Taj Mahal
Sarsai Nawar Wetland
Gir National Park
Asiatic Lion Reintroduction Project
Tiger & Lion Safari
Etawah gharana

References

External links
 Official website
 Link of online ticket booking

Safari parks
Protected areas of Uttar Pradesh
Tourist attractions in Etawah district
Etawah
Kanpur division
Tourist attractions in Uttar Pradesh
2019 establishments in Uttar Pradesh
Zoos established in 2019